Fernhill Park is a landed private estate and country house, situated on the edge of the village of Cranbourne in the civil parish of Winkfield in the English county of Berkshire, within the former bounds of Windsor Forest, four miles from Windsor, and in close vicinity of the Windsor Great Park.

Park
Other features of the property include a large man-made lake, a large walled kitchen garden (4000 square yards), and two farms Fernhill Farm and Forest Farm. These have been in existence since at least 1817.

Country house
At the centre of the property is Fern Hill on which a large Grade II early 18th century mansion stands.  This great mansion was visible from Lovel Lane, one of the four roads which serve as the boundary of the property.

History 
It is said that the large house was built by John Thorp in 1700, but little is documented of this.

The property was then in the possession of Thomas Hancock. Hancock is gazetted and inferred as being the registrar for entrants to "Her Majesty’s Plate of 100 guineas" which was to be held at Ascot on 7 August 1711. This incidentally was the beginning of horse racing at Ascot.
 
The next proprietor of Fern Hill was Lieutenant General Jasper Clayton (1675-1743), who died at the Battle of Dettingen. Jasper's wife predeceased him and so the property fell to his eldest son Jasper Clayton albeit with the recommendation that he sell the property.

The property then came into possession of a scion of the ancient Knollys family. Sir Francis Knollys (1722-1772), Baronet of Thame, Oxfordshire was resident of "Fearnhill" in 1772.  Having died childless the property passed in 1791 on the death of Francis' wife Dame Mary Knollys to his kinsman Francis Weldale who took the surname Knollys.   
The estate is mentioned in the will of Francis Knollys (Weldale) penned on 6 December 1805 who bequeathed the property to his wife Ann Knollys, noting the impeding sale of it to Sir Thomas Metcalfe, 1st Baronet. Knollys had sought the sum of £13,111 11s 11d  for the sale of the estate equivalent to £42.8 million (economic share) in 2002.

Metcalfe secured the property by auction in November 1805.
Fernhill remained in possession of this esteemed family for several generations. In 1854 Sir Thomas Metcalfe, 4th Baronet bequeathed the family estate to his eldest son Theophilus John Metcalfe on condition that the property descends with the Baronetcy so long as "legal male issue exists".

Forest Farm
Forest Farm was once an independent property. The original house was built in 1793, and it was described as a villa of brick stucco, and had the peculiarity of having "the whole extent of the entrance front formed into a green house".  Mary Squire is recorded as the holding the land in 1798 and resided there until her death in 1816. Henry Pelham-Clinton 7th Duke of Newcastle and his wife Katherine were the last owners, and held the possession of it until 1955. The house sometimes referred to Forest Hill was demolished as surplus to requirement on the behest of the honourable Irene Waite née Austin who owned Fernhill.

Explanatory notes

References

External links
 
 
 Historic England Building list 

Grade II listed buildings in Berkshire
Parks and open spaces in Berkshire
Winkfield
Country houses in Berkshire